Great Lakes Regional University (GLRU) is a private university in Uganda. The university is accredited by the Uganda National Council for Higher Education (UNCHE).

Location
The geographical coordinates of the university campus are: 0°53'05.0"S, 29°45'22.0"E (Latitude:-0.884722; Longitude:29.756111).

History
The institution was founded in the early 2000s as a private "tertiary" institution of education, by Hamlet Kabushenga, the former member of parliament of Kinkizi East Constituency. The university received accreditation from the UNCHE, under the name Great Lakes Regional College, in 2009.

The college began graduating students with diplomas and certificates in 2010, and in 2015 it held its 5th graduation ceremony. That same year, the institution received accreditation as a university and it admitted its pioneer class of undergraduates.

Academics
, the following courses were offered at the university.

 Undergraduate courses
 Bachelor of Archives and Records Management
 Bachelor of Agribusiness Management
 Bachelor of Business Administration
 Bachelor of Computer Science
 Bachelor of Development Studies
 Bachelor of Guidance and Counselling
 Bachelor of Human Resource Management
 Bachelor of Information Technology
 Bachelor of Library and Information Science
 Bachelor of Microfinance & Cooperatives Management
 Bachelor of Office and Information Management
 Bachelor of Procurement and Logistics Management
 Bachelor of Public Administration and Management
 Bachelor of Social Work and Social Administration
 Bachelor of Arts Education (Economics, History, English Language, Christian Religious Education, Geography & Kiswahili).
 Bachelor of Science Education (Biology, Physics, Mathematics, Agricultural Science & Economics)
 Bachelor of Sustainable Agriculture and Extension
 Bachelor of Tourism and Hotel Management
 Diploma in Christian Ministry & Entrepreneurship

 Diploma courses
 Diploma in Secondary Education
 Diploma in Primary Education
 Diploma in Early Childhood Education

 Certificate courses
 Certificate in Primary Education
 Certificate in Early Childhood Education

See also
List of universities in Uganda
List of university leaders in Uganda)

References

External links
Website of Great Lakes Regional University

Universities and colleges in Uganda
Educational institutions established in 2015
2015 establishments in Uganda
Kanungu District
Kigezi sub-region